UFC 44: Undisputed was a mixed martial arts event held by the Ultimate Fighting Championship on September 26, 2003, at the Mandalay Bay Events Center on the Las Vegas, Nevada. The event was broadcast live on pay-per-view in the United States, and later released on DVD.

History
Headlining the card was a Light Heavyweight Championship unification bout between Tito Ortiz and Randy Couture. The total fighter payroll for the event was $467,500. The ring interviewer was Eddie Bravo.  UFC 44 marked the first UFC appearance of future Welterweight Strikeforce Champion Nick Diaz.

Results

See also 
 Ultimate Fighting Championship
 List of UFC champions
 List of UFC events
 2003 in UFC

References

External links
 Official UFC Website
 UFC 44 Fighter Salaries

Ultimate Fighting Championship events
2003 in mixed martial arts
Mixed martial arts in Las Vegas
2003 in sports in Nevada